The Haditha massacre (also called the Haditha killings or the Haditha incident) was a series of killings on November 19, 2005, in which a group of United States Marines killed 24 unarmed Iraqi civilians. The killings occurred in Haditha, a city in Iraq's western province of Al Anbar. Among the dead were men, women, elderly people and children as young as 1, who were shot multiple times at close range while unarmed. The ensuing massacre took place after an improvised explosive device exploded near a convoy, killing  a lance corporal and severely injured two other marines. The immediate reaction was to seize 5 men in a nearby taxi and execute them on the street.

An initial Marine Corps communique reported that 15 civilians were killed by the bomb's blast and eight insurgents were subsequently killed when the Marines returned fire against those attacking the convoy. However, other evidence uncovered by the media contradicted the Marines' account. A Time magazine reporter's questions  prompted the United States military to open an investigation into the incident. The investigation found evidence that "supports accusations that U.S. Marines deliberately shot civilians", according to an anonymous Pentagon official. Three officers were officially reprimanded for failing to properly initially report and investigate the killings. On December 21, 2006, eight Marines from 3rd Battalion, 1st Marines were charged in connection with the incident.

By June 17, 2008, six defendants had their cases dropped and a seventh was found not guilty. The exception was former Staff Sergeant, now-Private Frank Wuterich. On October 3, 2007, the Article 32 hearing investigating officer recommended that charges of murder be dropped and Wuterich be tried for negligent homicide in the deaths of two women and five children.  Further charges of assault and manslaughter were ultimately dropped; Wuterich was convicted of a single count of negligent dereliction of duty on January 24, 2012. Wuterich received a rank reduction and pay cut but avoided jail time. Iraqis expressed disbelief and voiced outrage after the six-year U.S. military prosecution ended with none of the Marines sentenced to incarceration. A lawyer for the victims stated "this is an assault on humanity" before adding that he, as well as the Government of Iraq, might bring the case to international courts.

Events

Background
Since the 2003 invasion of Iraq, U.S. military forces had been stationed in and around Haditha to control the Haditha Dam, a major hydroelectric installation. The area had seen several clashes between U.S. forces and insurgent groups since the beginning of the Iraq War, with many fatalities on both sides.

A contemporary Time magazine poll reported that 85% of Iraq's Sunnis opposed coalition forces, as compared to 65% of Iraqis overall. Conditions in Haditha itself were known to have been deteriorating under militant rule, and attacks on U.S. troops as well as killings of suspected informants were common.

Roadside bombing
On November 19, 2005, an improvised explosive device (IED), composed of 155 mm artillery shells and explosive-filled propane tanks, was placed along their route some time before 3rd Battalion, 1st Marines (3/1) arrived in Haditha. The IED targeted a squad from 3/1 K Company, 3rd Platoon, which was on a resupply convoy. Lance Corporal Miguel Terrazas was killed instantly at 7:15 a.m. Terrazas was driving the Humvee when it was hit by the bomb. Lance Corporal James Crossan was in the passenger seat and was thrown out of the vehicle and trapped under the rear passenger tire. The Humvee was bisected by the explosion. Private First Class Salvador Guzman was in the back of the vehicle conducting security for the convoy and was thrown from the Humvee. Both Crossan and Guzman were taken to a landing zone to be evacuated for medical attention. Crossan was medically discharged from the USMC due to the wounds he received that day. Guzman returned to active duty after healing and went on a 2nd deployment with 3/1 to Iraq in April 2007.

Killings and immediate aftermath

Five Iraqi men, a taxi driver and four teenagers, were ordered out of their car and shot dead in the street, principally by Staff Sgt. Frank Wuterich. After their deaths, Lt. William T. Kallop, according to his statements to investigators, arrived on the scene. Kallop and others reported taking small-arms fire, which they attributed to a nearby house. Kallop gave the order "to take the house". Nineteen of those killed were in three adjacent houses which U.S. Marines entered, employing grenades and small arms. According to Kallop,

The Marines cleared it the way they had been trained to clear it, which is frags first. ... It was clear just by the looks of the room that frags went in and then the house was prepped and sprayed like with a machine gun and then they went in. And by the looks of it, they just ... they went in, cleared the room, everybody was down.

On November 20, 2005, a Marine press release from Camp Blue Diamond in Ramadi reported the deaths of a U.S. Marine and 15 civilians. It said the civilians' deaths resulted from a roadside bomb and Iraqi insurgents. The initial U.S. military statement read:

A US marine and 15 civilians were killed yesterday from the blast of a roadside bomb in Haditha. Immediately following the bombing, gunmen attacked the convoy with small arms fire. Iraqi army soldiers and Marines returned fire, killing eight insurgents and wounding another.BBC News "Haditha: Massacre and cover-up? "

Eman Waleed, a nine-year-old child who witnessed the incident, described the U.S. Marines entering their house. She said:

I couldn't see their faces very well - only their guns sticking in to the doorway. I watched them shoot my grandfather, first in the chest and then in the head. Then they killed my granny.

The director of the local hospital in Haditha, Dr Wahid, said that the 24 bodies were brought in two American humvees to the hospital around midnight on November 19. While the Marines claim that the victims had been killed by shrapnel from the roadside bomb and that the men were saboteurs, Dr Wahid said that there were "no organs slashed by shrapnel in any of the bodies". He further claimed that it appeared that "the victims were shot in the head and chest from close range."

Soon after the killings, the mayor of Haditha, Emad Jawad Hamza, led an angry delegation of elders to the Haditha Dam Marine base reportedly complaining to the base captain.

The Marine Corps paid $38,000 total to the families of 15 of the dead civilians.

Evidence about the killings
Video shot by the co-founder of the Hammurabi Human Rights Organization, Taher Thabet, which instigated Tim McGirk's original Time magazine article, and cellphone photos reportedly taken by one of the Marines the day after the killings have been put forth as evidence that the killings were methodical and without resistance. The video shot by Thabet showed the bodies of the women and children with gunshot wounds, bullet holes in the interior walls of the house, and bloodstains on the floor. Insufficient evidence has come to light to account for insurgents hiding in the houses that first came under attack.

McGirk's first article online stated that the Hammurabi Human Rights Group "coordinated with Human Rights Watch". A correction was issued when no official links could be confirmed. McGirk, who was based in Jerusalem, declined to testify at the hearings.

Legal proceedings
The intentional killing of noncombatants is prohibited by modern laws of war derived from the UN Charter, the Hague Conventions and the Geneva Conventions, and constitutes a war crime. The Marines and officers were subject to possible courts martial under American military law, the Uniform Code of Military Justice.

Attorney Gary Myers, who worked on the case, was the first lawyer in American history to use DNA evidence in a military trial dating back to the trial stemming from the My Lai massacre.

James Mattis' actions 
In his memoir Call Sign Chaos, then I Marine Expeditionary Force commander James N. Mattis explains his experience and actions in relation to the Haditha massacre. He claims to have read "more than nine thousand pages" of investigative material.  He concluded that "several have made tragic mistakes, but others had lost their discipline", which is why he recommended courts-martial for some Marines but not for others. The battalion commander was not aware of the details on the same day of the incident, and the killings were brought to light by a Time magazine reporter. Mattis relieved the battalion commander because the lack of reporting and the number of civilian deaths "should have alerted him that something very out of the ordinary ... had occurred." He then recommended letters of reprimand for the division commander and two colonels, stating, "[b]y their actions or inactions, they demonstrated lack of due diligence." This action forced the senior officers to leave active service.

Investigations
Upon being told of questions by reporters concerning the Haditha killings, Lt. Gen. Peter W. Chiarelli instructed his public affairs office to brief them with the results of the military investigation.  It was then he learned there had been no investigation.  On February 14, 2006, Chiarelli ordered a preliminary investigation, after video evidence  which conflicted with the initial U.S. report, was released. On March 9, a criminal investigation was launched, led by the Naval Criminal Investigative Service, to determine if the troops deliberately targeted Iraqi civilians.

On March 19, 2006, U.S. military officials confirmed that, contrary to the initial report, U.S. Marines, not Iraqi insurgents, killed 15 civilians.

Several official investigations began. The first, under United States Army Maj. Gen. Eldon Bargewell, examined how the incident was reported through the chain of command. A second investigation, headed by the Naval Criminal Investigative Service, examined the criminal aspects of the incident. A third investigation was launched by the Iraqi government. The conduct of Staff Sergeant Frank Wuterich, the squad leader, came under scrutiny.

On June 2, 2006, news outlets reported that 24 Iraqis had been killed, none as a result of the bomb explosion. This news anticipated the results of the U.S. military investigation, which found that the 24 unarmed Iraqis—including children as young as two years old and women—were killed by 12 members of K Company in the 3rd Battalion, 1st Marine Regiment, 1st Marine Division.

The Times published the result of the first investigation, under U.S. Army Maj. Gen. Eldon Bargewell, including eyewitness interviews. It noted that the "official investigation has already resulted in the removal of Lieutenant Colonel Jeffrey Chessani, the commanding officer, and Captain Luke McConnell and 10-years-veteran Captain James Kimber (born 1973), two company commanders, from their duties. Bargewell's investigation found:

Statements made by the chain of command during interviews for this investigation, taken as a whole, suggest that Iraqi civilian lives are not as important as U.S. lives, their deaths are just the cost of doing business, and that the Marines need to get "the job done" no matter what it takes. These comments had the potential to desensitize the Marines to concern for the Iraqi populace and portray them all as the enemy even if they are noncombatants.

On June 1, 2006, the Associated Press reported that the Iraqi government decided to launch its own probe into the alleged killing of 24 unarmed Iraqi civilians by U.S. Marines in the previous year. Adnan al-Kazimi, an adviser to Prime Minister Nouri al-Maliki, said the decision was made during a Cabinet meeting. The probe was to be carried out by a special committee made up of the Justice and Human Rights ministries, along with security officials.

The U.S. Marines investigation avoided public pronouncements about the killings, but on June 17, 2006, the New York Times reported that "Investigators have also concluded that most of the victims in three houses died from well-aimed rifle shots, not shrapnel or random fire, according to military officials familiar with the initial findings." Many of those killed had wounds from close-range fire, and their death certificates record "well-aimed shots to the head and chest" as the cause of death.

Charges leveled
On December 21, 2006, the U.S. military charged eight Marines in connection with the Haditha incident. Four of the eight, Frank Wuterich, Sanick P. Dela Cruz, James Donahue and Stephen Tatum, were accused of unpremeditated murder. Tatum was further charged with negligent homicide and assault, while Dela Cruz was also charged with making a false statement. Squad leader Frank Wuterich was charged with 12 counts of unpremeditated murder against individuals and one count of the murder of six people "while engaged in an act inherently dangerous to others". The battalion commander, Jeffrey Chessani, was charged with one count of violating a lawful order and two counts of dereliction of duty. First Lieutenant Andrew Grayson was charged with obstruction of justice, dereliction of duty, and making a false statement, while Captain Randy Stone and Captain Lucas McConnell were charged with dereliction of duty. Stone also faced an additional count of violating a lawful order.  All charges against Stone were later dropped.
Grayson was acquitted on all counts.

Pre-trial hearings
Testimony in an Article 32 investigation for Capt. Randy W. Stone, equivalent to a civilian grand jury proceeding, began on May 8, 2007.
At the hearing, Marine Lt. William Kallop, the platoon commander who ordered Marines to "clear" four houses, testified that the rules of engagement were followed and that no mistakes had been made. He stated that a Marine on the scene had reported seeing a suspected insurgent in the vicinity. Kallop also believed that small arms fire was being directed from the first house attacked by the Marines.

On May 9, Sergeant Sanick De la Cruz, who received immunity in return for testimony, testified that he watched Staff Sergeant Frank Wuterich shoot five Iraqis who were attempting to surrender. Cruz further testified that both he and Wuterich fired into the bodies of the five after they were dead, and that he had urinated on one of the dead Iraqis.

No weapons were found in the white taxi.

The US military attempted to subpoena material from a 60 Minutes interview with Staff Sergeant Wuterich, specifically material where Wuterich admitted to ordering his men to "shoot first and ask questions later." The interview includes Wuterich insisting he perceived a threat from house 1, but saw no gun fire from that house and that he saw no insurgent enter that house. He suggests he saw the dead family in house 1 and proceeded to assault house 2 based on a guess that the gunman may have entered that house. The Marines knocked on the door of house 2 and when someone came to answer they fired through the door killing what they saw to be an unarmed man. They then assaulted the house and killed the family inside. Wuterich later said he believed there was probably no threat to begin with.

The Article 32 investigation recommended Capt. Randy W. Stone's criminal charge be dismissed, but that he face a new lesser charge that would be handled administratively for failing to investigate the incident properly.
The charges against Stone were dropped on August 9.

Lt. Col. Jeffrey Chessani was recommended to face court-martial for having "failed to thoroughly and accurately report and investigate a combat action that clearly needed scrutiny." On June 17, 2008 Military Judge Colonel Steven Folsom dismissed all charges against Lt Colonel Jeffrey Chessani on the grounds that General James Mattis, who approved the filing of charges against Chessani, was improperly influenced by an investigator probing the incident. The ruling was without prejudice, which allows the prosecution to refile.

Lt. Col. Paul Ware, the Investigating Officer for several of the enlisted Marines, recommended on July 11, 2007, that LCpl. Justin Sharratt be cleared of these charges. Ware stated, "[t]he government version is unsupported by independent evidence... To believe the government version of facts is to disregard clear and convincing evidence to the contrary." The charges against Sharratt were dropped on August 9.

Article 32 hearings for LCpl. Stephen Tatum began July 16, and for SSgt. Frank Wuterich began in August. The investigating officer recommended charges be dropped against Tatum.

Charges dropped
On April 17, 2007, the Marine Corps dropped all charges against Sgt. Sanick P. De la Cruz in exchange for his testimony. Seven other Marines involved in the incident were also granted immunity.

On August 9, 2007, all charges against Lance Cpl. Justin Sharratt, Lance Cpl. James Donahue, and Capt. Randy Stone were dropped. On October 19, Lance Cpl. Justin Sharratt's commanding officer decided the charges should be lowered to involuntary manslaughter, reckless endangerment and aggravated assault.

On September 18, 2007, all charges against Captain Lucas McConnell were dropped in exchange for immunity and his cooperation with the investigation.

On March 28, 2008, all charges against LCpl. Stephen Tatum were dropped.

On June 17, 2008, all charges against Lt. Col. Jeffrey Chessani were dismissed by the military judge citing unlawful command influence. The Marine Corps appealed that ruling in 2008. On March 17, 2009, a military appeals court upheld the dismissal of the war crimes charges against Chessani. Facing an administrative Board of Inquiry, it also found no misconduct and recommended that Chessani be allowed to retire without loss of rank.

On June 5, 2008, 1st Lt. Andrew Grayson was acquitted of all charges stemming from the Haditha incident.  He had been charged with deleting photos of the deceased Iraqis in order to obstruct the investigation.  He had also been charged with failing to notify the Marine Corps administrative chain of command of his legal status when his term of service was expired and he was discharged from the Marine Corps.

Trial of Wuterich
The court martial of Wuterich, the only defendant to stand trial for the Haditha killings, took place in January 2012. During the trial Sgt. Sanick Dela Cruz testified that he urinated on the skull of one of the dead Iraqis. He also testified, after describing how Wuterich shot the passengers of the car himself from close range, "Sergeant Wuterich approached me and told me if anyone asks, the Iraqis were running away from the car and the Iraqi army shot them". In a plea deal, Wuterich pleaded guilty to dereliction of duty, while charges of assault and manslaughter were dropped. He was convicted of a single count of negligent dereliction of duty on January 24, 2012, receiving a rank reduction and pay cut but avoiding jail time.

Separation ordered for witnesses
In mid April 2012, The Secretary of the Navy informed the Commandant of the Marine Corps that he had reviewed the Haditha Incident and ordered Sgt Mendoza and Sgt Dela Cruz separated after they had testified in the trial of SSgt Wuterich. The Navy secretary said in the letter that his review of Dela Cruz and Mendoza's cases "revealed troubling information about their conduct". He cited false statements Dela Cruz made about the circumstances surrounding the deaths of five men found next to a white car at the scene. Mabus said Mendoza also lied and withheld information, without citing specifics. "Such conduct is wholly inconsistent with the core values of the Department of the Navy," Mabus said in the letter to Commandant Gen. Jim Amos. "You are directed to immediately initiate administrative processing for Sgt. Dela Cruz and Sgt. Mendoza for administrative separation in the best interest of the service." During Wuterich's trial, Mendoza and Dela Cruz acknowledged on the witness stand that they had lied to investigators to protect the squad. They told jurors that later they decided it was time to tell the truth. Both Marines were allowed to submit rebuttals to the separation proceeding. Both Marines were separated.

Reaction
According to former Democratic advisor Sidney Blumenthal in a Salon Magazine article,

The coverup at Haditha reportedly began instantly. However, an Iraqi journalism student shot a video the day after of the bloodstained and bullet-riddled houses where the massacre had occurred. That video made its way to an Iraqi human rights group and finally to Tim McGirk, a correspondent from Time magazine. When Time made its first queries, the Marine spokesman, Capt. Jeffrey S. Pool, who had issued the first statement on Haditha as an action against terrorists months earlier, told reporters that they were falling for al-Qaida propaganda. 'I cannot believe you're buying any of this,' he wrote in an e-mail. Nonetheless, word reached Lt. Gen. Peter W. Chiarelli, the second-highest-ranking U.S. military officer in Iraq, that there had been no investigation and he ordered one immediately.

According to the Los Angeles Times, military and congressional sources distinguished between two squads: the original Marine squad involved in the explosion and shootings, and a Marine intelligence squad that took photos shortly after the shootings.  According to LA Times sources, no investigation occurred until after a March 2006 Time magazine story alleging a massacre, even though the intelligence squad's photos were inconsistent with the Marine squad's report of a firefight. According to the Time story, military officials blamed the delay of the investigation on the Marine squad's efforts to cover up the events:
...Military officials say they believe the delay in beginning the investigation was a result of the squad's initial efforts to cover up what happened."
However, both military and congressional sources said that the "intelligence team" that took photos after the firefight did not appear to participate in any improper action:
...Military and congressional sources said there was no indication that the members of the intelligence team did anything improper or delayed reporting their findings."

The same LA Times story quoted Republican Representative John Kline of Minnesota as follows:
There is no question that the Marines involved, those doing the shooting, they were busy in lying about it and covering it up—there is no question about it. But I am confident, as soon as the command learned there might be some truth to this, they started to pursue it vigorously. I don't have any reason now to think there was any foot dragging.

In June 2006, Iraqi Prime Minister Nouri al-Maliki condemned the killings and called for a swift investigation, saying: "The crime and misery of Haditha ... is a terrible crime where women and children were eliminated."

John Dickerson and Dahlia Lithwick of Slate suggested that the Iraqis should be able to put the Marines on trial:

Let's let the Iraqis put the Americans alleged to have committed these crimes on trial. The United States wants to encourage the fledgling Iraqi institution of democracy, right? That's why we wanted Saddam tried in Iraq, and through the Iraqi judicial system--both to build up its legitimacy and to give Iraqis the sense of ownership that comes with having control over the legal process. Why, then, shouldn't we also turn over our own soldiers who were involved in either the Haditha massacre or any of the other possible massacres for trial under the Iraqi justice system?

Comments by Representative Murtha
On May 17, 2006, Democratic Representative John Murtha of Pennsylvania, a retired Marine colonel and critic of the war, stated at a news conference that an internal investigation had confirmed the story.
He was quoted as saying:

There was no firefight, there was no IED (improvised explosive device) that killed these innocent people. Our troops overreacted because of the pressure on them, and they killed innocent civilians in cold blood.

On August 2, 2006, Marine Corps Staff Sergeant Frank D. Wuterich, who led the accused squad, filed suit for libel and invasion of privacy. The filing alleged that Murtha "tarnished the Marine's reputation by telling news organizations in May that the Marine unit cracked after a roadside bomb killed one of its members and that the troops 'killed innocent civilians in cold blood'. Murtha also said repeatedly that the incident was 'covered up'." Wuterich was charged with nine counts of manslaughter in 2008, and Wuterich's lawsuit against Murtha was dismissed in 2009, as the court had determined Murtha was immune, having made his comments as a lawmaker.

On September 25, 2008, former Lance Cpl. Justin Sharratt, one of the Marines that had criminal charges that had been subsequently dropped, filed a slander suit against Rep. Murtha. The lawsuit stated that "Sharratt, in being labeled repeatedly by Murtha as a 'cold-blooded murderer', and by Murtha outrageously claiming that the Haditha incident was comparable to the infamous (My Lai) massacre of Vietnam, has suffered permanent, irreversible damage to his reputation."
In 2011, Sharratt's lawsuit was dismissed by the 3rd Circuit Court of Appeals. Sharratt killed himself at his home in Pennsylvania on August 3, 2022. He was 37.

Comparisons with My Lai massacre and other incidents
Many news reports compared the Haditha Killings to the 1968 My Lai massacre during the Vietnam War, with some commentators describing it as "Bush's My Lai", or "Iraq's My Lai". Very often, the killings have been described as part of a wider pattern of human rights abuses committed by American forces in Iraq. As a Spiegel reporter notes in an interview with Michael Sallah, who won a Pulitzer Prize for his investigation of atrocities committed by the Tiger Force unit in Vietnam, "you would have difficulties finding a single newspaper in Germany, or elsewhere in Europe, that does not deal with My Lai, Abu Ghraib, and Haditha in the same commentary." It was suggested that the Haditha killings might, like the My Lai Massacre, have resulted in further reduction of American public support for the conflict. Some rejected that comparison, however, including prominent journalist Christopher Hitchens who stated in a June 5, 2006 essay that:
...all the glib talk about My Lai is so much propaganda and hot air. In Vietnam, the rules of engagement were such as to make an atrocity – the slaughter of the My Lai villagers took almost a day rather than a white-hot few minutes – overwhelmingly probable. The ghastliness was only stopped by a brave officer who prepared his chopper-gunner to fire. In those days there were no precision-guided missiles, but there were "free-fire zones", and "body counts", and other virtual incitements to psycho officers such as Capt. Medina and Lt. Calley. As a consequence, a training film about My Lai – "if anything like this happens, you have really, truly screwed up" – has been in use for U. S. soldiers for some time.

The most frequent parallel drawn between the killing of 504 Vietnamese villagers at My Lai and the two dozen Iraqis killed in Haditha is the military instinct to cover-up and whitewash civilian deaths.  Martin Shaw pointed out on the analysis website OpenDemocracy, that of the 22 officers put on trial for the My Lai massacre, all were acquitted except for Lieutenant William Calley, who served only three and a half years of his life sentence. Professor Shaw observed that "in the few cases in which soldiers have been accused over atrocities in Iraq and Afghanistan, convictions have been few and far between."

Comparisons have also been made to the case of Ilario Pantano, who was initially charged with premeditated murder in Iraq but this was dropped after it was determined there was no credible evidence or testimony. Pantano himself has spoken out in defense of the "Haditha Marines", objecting to what he called a "rush to judgement".

The killings have also been compared to killings in Afghanistan, particularly the 2007 Shinwar shooting.

Allegations of investigative failures
Family, friends, defense lawyers and right-wing radio host Michael Savage strongly criticized the Naval Criminal Investigative Service (NCIS) for its role in the case. They highlighted the string of immunities that were granted as a sign of NCIS bungling. In mid-December 2011, 400 pages of classified notes from top-secret interviews with US soldiers about the 2005 killing of 24 civilians in Haditha were discovered in a dump on the outskirts of Baghdad. The Washington Post published NCIS photographs of the aftermath of the notorious incident.

Iraqi people
Iraqis expressed disbelief and voiced outrage after the six-year US military prosecution ended with none of the Marines sentenced to jail. The Iraqi government said that the ruling did "not fit the crime" and that it plans legal action on behalf of families of victims killed. Survivor Awis Fahmi Hussein commented.

I was expecting that the American judiciary would sentence this person to life in prison and that he would appear and confess in front of the whole world that he committed this crime, so that America could show itself as democratic and fair.

Youssef Ayid, who lost four brothers in the Haditha raid, said, "We are sad to see the criminals escape justice". "This is an assault on humanity" said Khalid Salman, a Haditha councillor and lawyer for the victims. He also said the sentence did not "mean the end" of his legal efforts.
"There are orphans, widows and old people who are still suffering and hurting from that terrible massacre. ...If we find no way, we will go to the international courts.".

Film
Battle for Haditha is a 2007 drama film directed by British director Nick Broomfield based on the incident. House Two is a 2018 documentary directed by Michael Epstein that investigates the Iraq War's worst war crime cases more than ten years later.

See also

2004 Fallujah ambush
Battle of Haditha
Human rights in post-invasion Iraq
Ilario Pantano

Incidents
Tal Afar checkpoint shooting
Ishaqi incident
Mahmudiyah rape and killings
Mukaradeeb wedding party massacre
FOB Ramrod kill team in War in Afghanistan
Abu Ghraib torture and prisoner abuse
Kandahar massacre

Notes

References

External links
 (video) Iraqis Voice Outrage as Haditha Massacre Trial Ends in No Jail Time for Accused U.S. Marines, Democracy Now!, January 26, 2012
 What happened at Haditha? BBC December 26, 2006
 The Massacre of Haditha - A Document Archive
 The Haditha Massacre, One Year Later
 Rules of Engagement - November 2006, Vanity Fair "Lieutenant testifies about Haditha deaths. Officer stands by call not to investigate." Steve Liewer, Union-Tribune, May 9, 2007. Describes the charges and the first day of Article 32 hearings of the Haditha trial.
Atrocity and War, Truthout, May 2, 2010. Discusses the impact of war upon the warrior.
 
 Rules of Engagement: What really happened at Haditha, Frontline PBS television'', February 19, 2008

Iraq War
Iraq–United States relations
Battles of the Iraq War in 2005
Massacres in 2005
Civilian casualties in the Iraq War
Massacres committed by the United States
United States military scandals
United States military war crimes
United States Marine Corps in the Iraq War
Occupation of Iraq
November 2005 events in Iraq